Secret Garden is an Irish-Norwegian band specialised in new instrumental music, led by the duo consisting of Irish violinist and singer Fionnuala Sherry and Norwegian composer, arranger and pianist Rolf Løvland.

The group came to fame when they won the 1995 Eurovision Song Contest, representing Norway with the composition "Nocturne".  In the course of a partnership lasting over 25 years, they have sold millions of albums worldwide, many of which went platinum in numerous countries.

History

Eurovision Song Contest
The group won the Eurovision Song Contest for Norway's second time in 1995 with the composition "Nocturne". It was the only time that a predominantly instrumental piece has won the Eurovision Song Contest, although a few Norwegian lyrics, written by screenwriter Petter Skavlan, were included to ensure that the entry adhered to the contest's rules. Norwegian singer Gunnhild Tvinnereim sang the song in the Eurovision Song Contest, with Hans Fredrik Jacobsen on penny whistle and Swedish nyckelharpist Åsa Jinder guesting on the occasion, although none of them are regular members of the group. Ten years earlier, Rolf Løvland wrote the song "La det swinge" (Let it swing) that secured Norway its first Eurovision Song Contest victory in 1985.

Debut album
Their success at Eurovision spearheaded the success of their first album Songs from a Secret Garden. It sold a million copies around the world going platinum in Norway and Korea, gold in Ireland, Hong Kong and New Zealand and spending two years in the Billboard new-age charts in 1996 and 1997. Barbra Streisand adapted "Heartstrings" from this album as the song "I've Dreamed of You" on her A Love Like Ours album. She also used "Heartstrings" in her wedding to James Brolin.

Further albums
Their sophomore album White Stones followed in 1997, and also made the top ten on Billboard New Age charts. Dawn of a New Century was released in 1999 as their third studio album, and again featured lyrics by Norway's Petter Skavlan.  Their 2001 studio album Once in a Red Moon also enjoyed success around the world, including reaching Billboard's  new-age top ten.

A compilation album, Dreamcatcher, was released in 2000.  Secret Garden released a Dreamcatcher: Best Of album for its tour through Australia and New Zealand in 2004, and this reached the top of the Australian New Age charts and the ARIA top 50 album charts.

After several other albums, they released their tenth album, Storyteller, in 2019.

Notable songs 

Secret Garden's most famous song "You Raise Me Up", originally performed by Johnny Logan and Brian Kennedy, has been recorded by more than a hundred other artists including Josh Groban, Russell Watson, Westlife, Sissel Kyrkjebø, Becky Taylor, Celtic Woman, Lena Park, Robert Tremlett, Il Divo, Rhydian, and Sergio Dalma.

"Nocturne" won the 1995 Eurovision Song Contest.  Their piece "Adagio", with a cor anglais solo, was used in the Wong Kar-wai film 2046 which was released in 2004.

Autobiographical book 
In 2015, Secret Garden published a book titled You Raise Me Up: The Story of Secret Garden co-written by Rolf Løvland with Fionnuala Sherry. The book tells their story of their triumphs as well as the trials and tribulations they endured along two decades.

Discography

Studio albums

Live albums

Compilation albums

External links 

Official YouTube channel

References

Irish folk musical groups
Norwegian folk musical groups
Eurovision Song Contest winners
Celtic music groups
Melodi Grand Prix contestants
New-age music groups
Eurovision Song Contest entrants for Norway
Eurovision Song Contest entrants of 1995
Melodi Grand Prix winners
Male–female musical duos
Irish musical duos
Norwegian musical duos